Baxter High School is a historic high school building in the Homewood North neighborhood of Pittsburgh, Pennsylvania. Built in 1908, is now home to the Pittsburgh Student Achievement Center, an alternative school for grades 6-12. It was listed on the National Register of Historic Places in 1986.

References

External links
 Pittsburgh Student Achievement Center

School buildings on the National Register of Historic Places in Pennsylvania
School buildings completed in 1908
Chicago school architecture in Pennsylvania
Pittsburgh History & Landmarks Foundation Historic Landmarks
Defunct schools in Pennsylvania
1908 establishments in Pennsylvania
Kiehnel and Elliott buildings
National Register of Historic Places in Pittsburgh